"Heartbeat" is a 1981 dance single by Taana Gardner. It was arranged by Dennis Weeden and Kenton Nix, and released by West End Records, with the more famous club mix created by Larry Levan. It reached the Billboard R&B chart at No. 10 and the No. 6 on the dance chart. It has sold over 800,000 copies.

Composition 
"Heartbeat" is a post-disco song, which runs for 9 minutes and 34 seconds for the 12-inch "Club version" mixed by Levan. It is set in common time and has a tempo of 100 beats per minute. Despite praise for its "hip-shaking, booty-bumpin' beats and rhythms" and hook-laden lyrics, it was considered peculiar at the time due to its slow tempo, "dizzy" vocal delivery and dissonant accompaniment. Danny Krivit recalls "When [Levan] put ["Heartbeat"] on, a full club of people left the room to get food. There was not one person left on the floor." Levan, known for his musical idiosyncrasies, kept playing the record at the Paradise Garage even several times in an evening until weeks later "no one [was] off the floor when they played ["Heartbeat"]." Because of its atypical "dance music-hostile" tempo numerous DJs find it unsuitable for dancefloors even today.

Reception 
In his consumer guide for The Village Voice, Robert Christgau reviewed the song's 12-inch release in 1981 and gave it an A rating, indicating "a great record both of whose sides offer enduring pleasure and surprise." He dubbed it a "classic one-shot" and "the hottest r&b record in the city right now for two self-evident reasons", stating:

Allmusic editor Andy Kellman found the song's rhythm "instantly memorable" and recognized its widespread sampling by hip hop producers, stating "Though hip hop fans are just as familiar with that bass line – often put to great use after its original recording — as rock fans are familiar with the guitar riffs of 'Purple Haze,' no song that has referenced 'Heartbeat' comes close to matching it." Kellman also writes that the song's "greatness comes down to Gardner's vocals just as much as that rhythm", stating:

Track listing
US: West End / WES-22132

Influence
"Heartbeat" has been extensively sampled in Hip hop music, pop music and dance music:

 Treacherous Three sampled "Heartbeat" for 1981 Rap song "Feel the Heartbeat".  On "Enjoy Records".
 T-Ski Valley sampled "Heartbeat" for his 1981 Rap song "Catch The Beat". On "Grand Groove Records".
 De La Soul sampled "Heartbeat" for the remixed version of 1989 single "Buddy".
 Eazy-E sampled "Heartbeat" for "Radio" (1988).
 Ini Kamoze sampled "Heartbeat" for his song "Here Comes The Hotstepper", a #1 song on the American pop charts in December 1994.
 D'Influence sampled "Heartbeat" for their remix of "Crazy" by Mark Morrison, which peaked at #6 on the UK Singles Chart in 1996.
 Musiq Soulchild  sampled De La Soul's "Buddy (Native Tongues Decision Remix)", and interpolations from the composition "Heartbeat (Kenton Mix)" for his song "B.U.D.D.Y.".
 Norwegian pop singer Annie based her song "I Will Get On" on Gardner's song "Heartbeat".
 DMX sampled "Heartbeat" for the song entitled "It's All Good (Love My Niggas)" (1998).
 Mack 10 sampled "Heartbeat" for his 1998 song, "LBC and the ING", which features Snoop Dogg on the album The Recipe.
 JX sampled "Heartbeat" for "There's Nothing I Won't Do" (1996).
 Nationwide Rip Ridaz sampled the whole song on the track titled "Better Watch Your Back (Fucc Slob)".
 SWV sampled "Heartbeat" for the "You're the One" Allstar Remix.
 The song appeared in the film 3 Strikes.
 araabMUZIK sampled and remixed "Heartbeat" on his 2013 instrumental compilation album "The Remixes, Vol. 1".
 The song has also been featured on the oldies Funk station "Space 103.2" in the big hit video game Grand Theft Auto V.
 Dutch house duo Homework sampled "Heartbeat" on their 2011 track Hudson Square.
 Blacksmith sampled "Heartbeat" on their 1998 remix of Tina Moore - Nobody Better (Blacksmith R'n'B Rub).
 Shinehead sampled "Heartbeat" on his 1992 "Try My Love"

 Heavy D & the Boyz sampled “Heartbeat” on their song “Something Goin’ On” from their 1994 album “Nuttin’ But Love”

Cover versions

In 1990, Seduction (featuring April Harris on lead vocals) recorded the song peaking at number two on the US dance chart.  This version also peaked at number twenty-one on the soul chart and number thirteen on the Hot 100.

Chart performance

Taana Gardner version

Seduction version

See also
List of post-disco artists and songs

References

1981 singles
1990 singles
Post-disco songs
1981 songs
West End Records singles
Seduction (group) songs